Henry Francis Whight (11 March 1882 – 12 March 1926) was a former Australian rules footballer who played with Carlton in the Victorian Football League (VFL).

Family
The son of William Frederick Whight (1855–1938), and Charlotte Eliza Whight (1858–1939), née Smith, Henry Francis Whight was born at Cheltenham, Victoria on 11 March 1882.

He married Agnes Janet Morton Addis (1883–1961) in 1905.

Football

Footscray (VFA)

Carlton (VFL)
In June 1904 he was cleared from Footscray to Carlton.

Williamstown (VFA)
In May 1905 he was cleared from Carlton to Yarraville Britannia.

In May 1906 he was cleared from Carlton to Williamstown.

Death
He died at the Austin Hospital, Heidelberg on 12 March 1926.

Notes

External links 
 		
 
 Henry Whight's profile at Blueseum
 Henry Whight, at The VFA Project.

1882 births
Australian rules footballers from Melbourne
Carlton Football Club players
Footscray Football Club (VFA) players
1926 deaths
People from Cheltenham, Victoria